Enrico Arbarello is an Italian mathematician who is a leading expert in algebraic geometry.

He earned a Ph.D. at Columbia University in New York in 1973. He was a visiting scholar at the Institute for Advanced Study from 1993-94.  He is now a Mathematics Professor at Sapienza University of Rome.
In 2012 he became a fellow of the American Mathematical Society.

References

External links 
University site

Living people
Columbia University alumni
Institute for Advanced Study visiting scholars
20th-century Italian mathematicians
21st-century Italian mathematicians
Fellows of the American Mathematical Society
1945 births
Algebraic geometers
Academic staff of the Sapienza University of Rome
Academic staff of the Scuola Normale Superiore di Pisa